Gastric electrical stimulation, also known as implantable gastric stimulation, is the use of specific devices to provide electrical stimulation to the stomach to try to bring about weight loss in those who are overweight or improve gastroparesis.

Gastric electrical stimulation is a pacemaker-like device with electrical connections to the surface of the stomach. The device works by disrupting of the motility cycle or stimulating enteric nervous system. There are a number of different devices on the market including Transend, Maestro, and Diamond.

Medical uses
These devices are for treatment of gastroparesis. The best available evidence, however, find that they are of questionable utility for this condition.

As of 2017 it is not approved for use for obesity in the United States. The first studies done did not find a benefit, however, research is ongoing.

Mechanism of action

Once food leaves the stomach and enters the duodenum, the gut-brain-liver axis is activated, which involves signaling between the gastrointestinal tract and the nervous system. For patients without type 2 diabetes, the gastric transit time of food is estimated to be 30–45 minutes (the time from food ingestion to food leaving the stomach into the duodenum). In type 2 diabetes, the neurohormonal communication system is impaired. Delayed signaling within the gut-brain-liver axis leads to high blood glucose concentration after meals.

Usage
There are approximately 4,000 gastric pacer surgeries a year in the United States.

Approval
The Diamond system first received CE mark in 2007 and is approved for sale in Europe, Australia, and Hong Kong. It is not approved in the United States for obesity.

References

Medical technology